Finnish Workers' Sports Federation football team was an association football team representing the Finnish Workers' Sports Federation (TUL) in 1921–1950. At the time, the sport in Finland was divided as the leftist TUL was isolated from the right-wing sports movement. In football, the TUL clubs and the Finnish Football Association (SPL) clubs competed in their own championship series and the Finnish national football team was selected of the SPL players only. The TUL football team participated the International Workers' Olympiads in 1925, 1931 and 1937 and the Moscow Spartakiad in 1928.

History

Background 
After the 1918 Finnish Civil War, the Finnish Gymnastics and Sports Federation (SVUL) dismissed all clubs and athletes who had participated the war on the Red side. In January 1919, the expelled labour movement related associations established the Finnish Workers' Sports Federation (TUL). The Finnish sports movement was now divided as the parties did not cooperate. Both federations had their own competition systems and the national teams were composed of SVUL athletes only. Instead of the Olympic Games, the TUL athletes participated the Workers' Olympiads and the Spartakiads.

In football, TUL and the Finnish Football Association (SPL), which was a member of the SVUL, had their own championship series. The Football Association winner was declared as the Finnish Champion until 1944, in 1945–1948, the title was decided on a final match between the TUL and Football Association champions. The TUL Championship series was finally merged with the Football Association's Mestaruussarja in 1956.

Formation and the international contacts 
Finnish Workers' Sports Federation football team was established in September 1922. The squad toured in Soviet Russia, meeting seven local sides and gaining three wins. The match against the Soviet XI ended 4–1 for the Russians. These matches were the first international contacts the Soviet sports had after the 1917 October Revolution. A year later, the Soviet Union national football team visited Finland and beat the TUL squad 5–0.

TUL football team participated all three International Workers' Summer Olympiads in 1925, 1931 and 1937. At the 1925 Olympiads in Frankfurt, TUL squad reached the final against the German team of Arbeiter-Turn- und Sportbund. The final was played at Waldstadion in front of a 40,000 spectators. In 1928, the TUL football team participated the Spartakiad in Moscow, although the federation's Social Democratic board had forbid the contacts with the Soviet-led Red Sports International. As a result, the Communist clubs who had sent their athletes to the Spartakiad were dismissed from TUL in 1929. Most of the expelled footballers joined the member clubs of the Finnish Football Association in order to continue their career. This also made possible for them to be selected to the national team.

In addition, to the Workers' Olympiad and the Spartakiad, TUL football team played 16 matches against international opponents between 1922 and 1939. The leftist press often called them ″caps″, like the ones of the Finland national team. Except the Soviet Union, the opponents were teams of the local workers' sports federations; the German Arbeiter-Turn- und Sportbund, Norwegian Arbeidernes Idrettsforbund, Swedish Arbetarnas Idrottsförening, Latvian Strādnieku Sporta Savienība and the Estonian Eesti Töölisspordi Liit. In some cases, TUL met the Soviet national team, but usually the rival was a regional selection. From the 16 matches TUL managed to win only three.

Since the late 1920s, several TUL footballers switched to the Finnish Football Association's side. In the 1930s, these ″defectors″ formed the spine of the Finland national team. For example, the Finland squad at the 1936 Summer Olympics was composed of eight former TUL players. By the World War II, a total of 13 former TUL footballers were selected to the national team. These defectors were usually considered as traitors, but many returned TUL as the relations were normalized after the war.

Cooperation with the Finnish Football Association 
As Finland was elected to host the 1940 Summer Olympics, TUL and SVUL launched negotiations of cooperation in 1937. Finally, TUL and the Finnish Football Association signed an agreement in May 1939. In 6 July, the TUL football team and the Finnish Football Association XI met at the Helsinki Olympic Stadium. The match ended 4–1 for the Football Association. This was the first time since 1917 as the two sides competed together. In the next 11 years, TUL and the Football Association squads met 9 times. As the most talented TUL players had switched side, the Football Association won 8 matches with a goal difference of 26–11.

According to the agreement, the TUL players were now selected to the Finland national team for the first time. The first TUL player representing Finland was Kaarlo Niilonen who debuted against Sweden in October 1943. In the late 1940s, one third of the national team came from the TUL side.

Competition record

1925 Workers' Summer Olympiad 
Semifinal

Final

Squad: Asser Dammert, Reino Fri, Ernst Grönlund, Lauri Heinonen, Kaarlo Lehto, Viljo Lehto, Yrjö Lehtonen, Valter Lundström, Emil Nylund, L. Posti, Eino Rantanen, Aarne Rantanen, Vieno Vuorenpää, Viljo Vuorinen.

1928 Moscow Spartakiad 
Preliminary round

3rd place match

Squad: Väinö Forsten, Reino Fri, Ernst Grönlund, Viljo Halme, Frans Karjagin, Leevi Kekkonen, Tauno Kekkonen, Lauri Präktig, Eero Ronkanen, Armas Savolainen, Gunnar Therman, Brynolf Weckström.

1931 Workers' Summer Olympiad 
First round

Consolation tournament

Squad: Sulo Alava, Johan Alho, Paavo Eklund, Jaakko Itkonen, T. Itkonen, Erkki Pastinen, Akseli Pulkkinen, Einari Puukko, Eino Rantanen, Tauno Speeti, A. Suni, Viljo Vahtera, Kurt Weckström, Valfrid Virtanen.

1937 Workers' Summer Olympiad 
First round

Consolation tournament

Squad: Eino Flinck, Voitto Happonen, Eero Honkonen, Arvi Koponen, Axel Nyström, Arvo Pesonen, Akseli Pulkkinen, Toivo Pulkkinen, Eino Rantanen, Tauno Raunio, Lasse Salo, Reino Valkama, T. Valtanen.

References 

Football in Finland
History of association football
Olympic Games